Russell Town Hall is a historic town hall building located at Russell in St. Lawrence County, New York.  It was built in 1921 and is a three-story Classical Revival style structure. The ground story is built of sandstone and upper story is of brick.  It was originally constructed with town offices on the lower floor and a two-story theater on the upper floor.   The five bay east facade features a three bay portico.  The site was donated to the community in about 1917 by Seymour H. Knox I, who was born at Russell in April 1861.

It was listed on the National Register of Historic Places in 1996.

References

City and town halls on the National Register of Historic Places in New York (state)
Neoclassical architecture in New York (state)
Government buildings completed in 1921
Buildings and structures in St. Lawrence County, New York
National Register of Historic Places in St. Lawrence County, New York
1921 establishments in New York (state)